The Scottish Law Commission is an advisory non-departmental public body of the Scottish Government. It was established in 1965 to keep Scots law under review and recommend necessary reforms to improve, simplify and update the country's legal system. It was established by the Law Commissions Act 1965 (as amended) at the same time as the Law Commission in England and Wales.

Appointments are ordinarily made in accordance with the Commissioner for Public Appointments in Scotland's Code of Practice.

The commission is part of the Commonwealth Association of Law Reform Agencies.

Functions
The Commission exists to keep Scots law under review and recommend reform as needed.  The commission's scope encompasses devolved and reserved matters, as defined by the Scotland Act 1998 and as such has duty for laws that are the responsibility of the Parliament of the United Kingdom, as well as those that are the responsibility of the Scottish Parliament.

Composition

The commission consists of five commissioners appointed by the Scottish Ministers. One of the commissioners is the chairman who by convention is a Senator of the College of Justice. The other commissioners are drawn from those holding judicial office, advocates, solicitors or university law teachers. Commissioners are appointed for a maximum term of five years with the possibility of re-appointment. The current commissioners are as follows:

The Rt Hon Lady Paton (chair)
David Bartos
Professor Gillian Black
Catherine Dowdalls QC
Professor Frankie McCarthy

The commissioners are supported by the interim chief executive of the commission, Mr Charles Garland, and by legal and non-legal staff. All permanent staff are seconded from the Scottish government.

Chairs

The past and current chairs are as follows:

Lord Kilbrandon (1965–1971)
Lord Hunter (1971–1981)
Lord Maxwell (1981–1988)
Lord Davidson (1988–1996)
Lord Gill (1996–2001)
Lord Eassie (2002–2006)
Lord Drummond Young (2007–2011)
Lady Clark (2012–2013)
Lord Pentland (2014–2018)
Lady Paton (2019–present)

References

Further reading

External links
 

1965 establishments in Scotland
Legal organisations based in Scotland
Law Commission
Government agencies established in 1965
Organisations based in Edinburgh
Scottish commissions and inquiries
Law commissions
Law reform in the United Kingdom
Reform in Scotland